James Meiklejohn (born 28 June 1984) is an Australian rules footballer who played for Sydney in the Australian Football League (AFL) in 2003 and 2004.

He was drafted from the NSW-ACT Under 18s side with the 71st selection in the 2003 Rookie Draft.  He played six games in two seasons at the Swans before he was delisted at the end of the 2004 season.

Mieklejohn captained Port Adelaide Magpies in the SANFL.

References

External links

Living people
1984 births
Sydney Swans players
Australian rules footballers from New South Wales
NSW/ACT Rams players
Port Adelaide Football Club (SANFL) players
Port Adelaide Football Club players (all competitions)
Tuggeranong Football Club players